Top Sergeant Mulligan is a 1928 American silent comedy film directed by James P. Hogan and starring Donald Keith, Lila Lee and Wesley Barry.

Synopsis
During World War I a vaudevillian Mickey Neilan enlists in the army and encounters the domineering Sergeant Mulligan, who is a love rival for Neilan's former stage partner. In France Mickey is captured while searching for a Germany spy and is taken to Berlin.

Cast
 Donald Keith as 	Osborne Wellington Pratt
 Lila Lee as 	The Girl
 Wesley Barry as Mickey Neilan
 Gareth Hughes as Lt. Fritz von Lang
 Wheeler Oakman as The captain
 Wade Boteler as Top Sgt. Mulligan
 Sheldon Lewis as 	The Spy

References

Bibliography
 Connelly, Robert B. The Silents: Silent Feature Films, 1910-36, Volume 40, Issue 2. December Press, 1998.
 Munden, Kenneth White. The American Film Institute Catalog of Motion Pictures Produced in the United States, Part 1. University of California Press, 1997.

External links
 

1928 films
1928 comedy films
1920s English-language films
American silent feature films
Silent American comedy films
American black-and-white films
Films directed by James Patrick Hogan
American World War I films
Films set in France
Films set in Berlin
1920s American films